The following lists events that happened during 1861 in South Africa.

Incumbents
 Governor of the Cape of Good Hope and High Commissioner for Southern Africa:
 Sir George Grey (until 14 August).
 Sir Robert Wynyard (acting from 15 August).
 Lieutenant-governor of the Colony of Natal: John Scott.
 State President of the Orange Free State: Marthinus Wessel Pretorius.
 President of the Executive Council of the South African Republic: Stephanus Schoeman (acting).

Events
August
 15 – Sir Robert Wynyard becomes acting Governor of the Cape of Good Hope and High Commissioner for Southern Africa.

September
 16 – Roman Rock Lighthouse at the entrance to Simon's Town begins operating after taking 4 years to build.

Births
 10 November – Robert T. A. Innes, astronomer and secretary-accountant at the Cape observatory. (d. 1933)
 Sefako Mapogo Makgatho, the second African National Congress president. (d. 1951)

Deaths

References

South Africa
Years in South Africa
History of South Africa